IRVINE02 is an educational 1U CubeSat mission that gives high school students the experience of building, testing, and controlling a nano-satellite to develop interest and talent in the science and engineering fields. The mission features the second orbital ion electrospray thruster developed by Accion Systems. Beyond the thruster, IRVINE02 utilizes magnetorquers, deployable solar arrays, a GPS unit, and a miniaturized 1.4 Watt blue laser communication module to transmit pictures and data back to Earth. The magnetorquers and the laser are both developed by the Ecuadorian Space Agency. This laser made IRVINE02 the first 1U cubesat to fly with an orbit-to-ground laser communications device. It transmits data and pictures to the Earth much faster than radio.

IRVINE02 is the second CubeSat built by ICSP, the first being IRVINE01.

On February 17, 2017, NASA selected IRVINE02 to participate in NASA's eighth class of Educational Launch of Nanosatellites (ELaNa) CubeSat launch candidates.

IRVINE02 launched on December 3, 2018 from Vandenberg Air Force Base on the Spaceflight Industries SSO-A: Smallsat Express mission aboard a SpaceX Falcon 9 rocket alongside 64 other spacecraft.

See also
 IRVINE01

References

Education in Irvine, California
CubeSats
Student satellites
Spacecraft launched in 2018
Satellites of the United States
2018 in the United States